In mathematics, particularly linear algebra, an orthonormal basis for an inner product space V with finite dimension is a basis for  whose vectors are orthonormal, that is, they are all unit vectors and orthogonal to each other.  For example, the standard basis for a Euclidean space  is an orthonormal basis, where the relevant inner product is the dot product of vectors.  The image of the standard basis under a rotation or reflection (or any orthogonal transformation) is also orthonormal, and every orthonormal basis for  arises in this fashion.

For a general inner product space  an orthonormal basis can be used to define normalized orthogonal coordinates on   Under these coordinates, the inner product becomes a dot product of vectors.  Thus the presence of an orthonormal basis reduces the study of a finite-dimensional inner product space to the study of  under dot product.  Every finite-dimensional inner product space has an orthonormal basis, which may be obtained from an arbitrary basis using the Gram–Schmidt process.

In functional analysis, the concept of an orthonormal basis can be generalized to arbitrary (infinite-dimensional) inner product spaces. In this case, the orthonormal basis is sometimes called a Hilbert basis for   Note that an orthonormal basis in this sense is not generally a Hamel basis, since infinite linear combinations are required. Specifically, the linear span of the basis must be dense in  but it may not be the entire space.

If we go on to Hilbert spaces, a non-orthonormal set of vectors having the same linear span as an orthonormal basis may not be a basis at all. For instance, any square-integrable function on the interval  can be expressed (almost everywhere) as an infinite sum of Legendre polynomials (an orthonormal basis), but not necessarily as an infinite sum of the monomials 

A different generalisation is to pseudo-inner product spaces, finite-dimensional vector spaces  equipped with a non-degenerate symmetric bilinear form known as the metric tensor. In such a basis, the metric takes the form  with  positive ones and  negative ones.

Examples

Note that both the standard basis and standard dot product rely on viewing  as the Cartesian product 
Proof: A straightforward computation shows that the inner products of these vectors equals zero,  and that each of their magnitudes equals one,  This means that  is an orthonormal set. All vectors  can be expressed as a sum of the basis vectors scaled  so  spans  and hence must be a basis.
 For , the standard basis and inner product are similarly defined. Any other orthonormal basis is related to the standard basis by an orthogonal transformation in the group O(n).
 For pseudo-Euclidean space , an orthogonal basis  with metric  instead satisfies  if ,  if , and  if . Any two orthonormal bases are related by a pseudo-orthogonal transformation. In the case , these are Lorentz transformations.
 The set  with  where  denotes the exponential function, forms an orthonormal basis of the space of functions with finite Lebesgue integrals,  with respect to the 2-norm. This is fundamental to the study of Fourier series.
 The set  with  if  and  otherwise forms an orthonormal basis of 
 Eigenfunctions of a Sturm–Liouville eigenproblem.
 The column vectors of an orthogonal matrix form an orthonormal set.

Basic formula

If   is an orthogonal basis of  then every element  may be written as

When   is orthonormal, this simplifies to

and the square of the norm of  can be given by

Even if  is uncountable, only countably many terms in this sum will be non-zero, and the expression is therefore well-defined.

Incomplete orthogonal sets

Existence

Using Zorn's lemma and the Gram–Schmidt process (or more simply well-ordering and transfinite recursion), one can show that every Hilbert space admits an orthonormal basis; furthermore, any two orthonormal bases of the same space have the same cardinality (this can be proven in a manner akin to that of the proof of the usual dimension theorem for vector spaces, with separate cases depending on whether  the larger basis candidate is countable or not). A Hilbert space is separable if and only if it admits a countable orthonormal basis. (One can prove this last statement without using the axiom of choice.)

Choice of basis as a choice of isomorphism

For concreteness we discuss orthonormal bases for a real,  dimensional vector space  with a positive definite symmetric bilinear form . 

We can now view the basis as a map  which is an isomorphism of inner product spaces: to make this more explicit we can write

The inverse is a component map

These definitions make it manifest that there is a bijection

The space of isomorphisms admits actions of orthogonal groups at either the  side or the  side. For concreteness we fix the isomorphisms to point in the direction , and consider the space of such maps, . 

As a principal homogeneous space

In other words, the space of orthonormal bases is like the orthogonal group, but without a choice of base point: given the space of orthonormal bases, there is no natural choice of orthonormal basis, but once one is given one, there is a one-to-one correspondence between bases and the orthogonal group.
Concretely, a linear map is determined by where it sends a given basis: just as an invertible map can take any basis to any other basis, an orthogonal map can take any orthogonal basis to any other orthogonal basis.

See also

References

External links

 This Stack Exchange Post discusses why the set of Dirac Delta functions is not a basis of L2([0,1]).

Fourier analysis
Functional analysis
Linear algebra